The National Committee for Intelligence Coordination is the principal forum used by the Prime Minister of Bangladesh for matters of national security and coordination between intelligence agencies. Since its inception under Sheikh Hasina, the function of the council has been to advise and assist the prime minister on national security and foreign policies.

The committee also serves as the prime minister's principal arm for coordination, integration of intelligence on foreign, defense, and internal security matters by bringing together the principal civilian and military intelligence outfits. The council has counterparts in the Joint Intelligence Committee of many other nations.

History 
Bangladesh is situated nearby the infamous ―Golden Crescent and close to the ―Golden Triangle- located in Myanmar. This makes it a transit point for the smuggling of heroin and illegal arms from Myanmar. From Bangladesh, one can easily reach Pakistan and Afghanistan. The close proximity of Bangladesh to Myanmar, Pakistan, Afghanistan and insurgency affected states of India also results in a high probability for Bangladesh to have complex security problems arising from terrorism.

The last nail of the coffin that showed the lack of co-ordination between intelligence agencies was the disastrous mutiny in the Bangladesh Rifles (BDR) in 2009, in which the country lost 74 people, including 47 military officers. Reform initiatives taken after the mutiny which led to the creation of "National Committee for Intelligence Coordination".

Structure 
Compared with the American, British, and Indian intelligence co-ordination structures the intelligence co-ordination mechanism in Bangladesh is unique. At least two factors can reveal why the Bangladeshi case is unique, and does not resemble the UK, US or Indian model.

First, the Prime Minister's security advisor is the coordinator of the NCIC unlike UK and India, where a serving bureaucrat in the cabinet secretariat assumes the role of intelligence coordinator. In the US, the Director of National Intelligence (DNI) is responsible for the co-ordination of various civilian, military, and signals intelligence agencies. In the United Kingdom and India, the Joint Intelligence Committee (JIC)—located in the cabinet secretariat—is responsible for the co-ordination of domestic, external, and defence intelligence agencies. Therefore, a cabinet secretary in the British and Indian system of JIC acts as a counterpart of American DNI.

Second, the co-ordination structure in Bangladesh is also sharply different from the American case, in which the position of Director of National Intelligence is separate from that of the National Security Advisor.

Membership 
In July 2009, the government formed an eight-member "National Committee for Intelligence Coordination," with the prime minister as the chairperson, to effectively co-ordinate the intelligence activities of different agencies.

This committee coordinated by her security advisor. The NCIC comprises the Cabinet Secretary, Principal Secretary to the Prime Minister's Office and the respective Director Generals of the National Security Intelligence (NSI), the Directorate General of Forces Intelligence (DGFI), Special Security Force (SSF) and the Inspector General of Police. The heads of the Rapid Action Battalion (Rab), the Special Branch (SB), and the Criminal Investigation Department (CID) are required to assist the NCIC in performing its activities.

Functions 
 Provide necessary information to the government before any crisis arises.
 Coordinate and strengthen the activities of the various intelligence agencies functioning within Bangladesh.
 Improving the campaign against extremism through exchanges between law enforcement and intelligence agencies.

References 

Government of Bangladesh
Bangladeshi intelligence agencies
Intelligence analysis agencies